Somerby may refer to:

Places
 Somerby, Leicestershire, a village near Melton Mowbray
 Somerby (Juxta Bigby), a hamlet near Brigg, Lincolnshire
 Somerby by Gainsborough, a hamlet near Gainsborough, Lincolnshire
 Somerby Golf Club and Community in Byron, Minnesota
Old Somerby, Lincolnshire

People
Somerby (surname)

See also
Somersby (disambiguation)
Sommersby